Cryptothelea gloverii is a species of bagworm moth. Its native range includes North and Central America.

It favors orange trees, and also eat the camphor scale (Pseudaonidia duplex), a scale insect.

References 

Psychidae
Moths of Central America
Taxa named by Alpheus Spring Packard
Moths described in 1869